Simple path may refer to:

 Simple path (graph theory), a simple path is a path in a graph which does not have repeating vertices